Amata paraula is a species of moth of the family Erebidae first described by Edward Meyrick in 1886. It is found in Australia, where it has been recorded from the Northern Territory and Queensland.

The wingspan is about 30 mm. The abdomen is banded with black and yellow.

References 

paraula
Moths described in 1886
Moths of Australia